This list is for ecoregions with high endemism. According to the World Wide Fund for Nature, the following ecoregions have the highest percentage of endemic plants.

Ecoregions

 Fynbos (South Africa)
 Hawaiian tropical dry forests (United States)
 Hawaiian tropical rainforests (United States)
 Kwongan heathlands (Australia)
 Madagascar dry deciduous forests (Madagascar)
 Madagascar lowland forests (Madagascar)
 New Caledonia dry forests (New Caledonia)
 New Caledonia rain forests (New Caledonia)
 Sierra Madre de Oaxaca pine-oak forests (Mexico)
 Sierra Madre del Sur pine-oak forests (Mexico)
 Luzon montane rainforests (Philippines)
 Luzon rainforests (Philippines)
 Luzon tropical pine forests (Philippines)
 Mindanao montane rain forests (Philippines)
 Mindanao-Eastern Visayas rain forests (Philippines)
 Palawan rain forests (Philippines)

See also
 Centre of endemism
 Endemism in the Hawaiian Islands

References

Botany
Ecology
Endemism